Norman Frederick Horner (10 May 1926 – 24 December 2003) was an English first-class cricketer, who played two games for Yorkshire County Cricket Club in 1950, before moving to Warwickshire County Cricket Club in 1951. A right-handed batsman, he made 18,533 runs at 29.79 in his 362-game career.

Born in Queensbury, West Yorkshire, Horner was a neat, dapper batsman, who formed a powerful opening partnership with Fred Gardner, and scored a thousand runs in every season up to 1964.  M.J.K. Smith commented that "Norman would have run Fred's legs off him if he had been allowed". He went down the order in 1958, when the Marylebone Cricket Club (MCC) asked Warwickshire to promote Smith to develop him for a possible England opening spot.  Horner scored quickly, and enjoyed his best three seasons from 1959 to 1961.  On a flat Oval pitch in 1960 he scored a career-best 203 not out, and put on 377 with Billy Ibadulla for the first wicket on the first day, then the highest unbroken opening partnership in cricket history. He was quick in the covers and took 131 catches. He retired in 1965 to concentrate on landscape gardening and his work as a cricket groundsman.

Horner died in Driffield, Yorkshire in December 2003, at the age of 77.

References

External links
 
 Norman Horner at CricketArchive

1926 births
2003 deaths
English cricketers
Warwickshire cricketers
Yorkshire cricketers
English cricket coaches
People from Queensbury, West Yorkshire
Players cricketers
Marylebone Cricket Club cricketers
Sportspeople from Yorkshire
T. N. Pearce's XI cricketers